Molesworth is a former railway station in Molesworth, Victoria, Australia.

References

Railway stations in Australia opened in 1890
Railway stations closed in 1978
Disused railway stations in Victoria (Australia)
Mansfield railway line